Meranges is a village in the comarca of Cerdanya, province of Girona, Catalonia, north-eastern Spain.

Attractions include the Romanesque church of Sant Serni. It has a portal with sculpted archivolts.

References

Panareda Clopés, Josep Maria; Rios Calvet, Jaume; Rabella Vives, Josep Maria (1989). Guia de Catalunya, Barcelona: Caixa de Catalunya.  (Spanish).  (Catalan).

External links
 Government data pages 

Municipalities in Cerdanya (comarca)
Municipalities in the Province of Girona
Populated places in the Province of Girona